China National Highway 210 (G210) runs from Mandula in Baotou, Inner Mongolia to Fangchenggang, Guangxi. It is 3,097 kilometres in length and runs south from Baotou and passes through the province-level divisions of Shaanxi, Sichuan, Chongqing, Guizhou, and ends in Guangxi.

Route and distance

See also 
 China National Highways

References
Official website of Ministry of Transport of PRC

210
Transport in Guangxi
Transport in Guizhou
Transport in Shaanxi
Transport in Sichuan
Transport in Chongqing
Transport in Inner Mongolia